The 1974 South Pacific Championships was an Association of Tennis Professionals men's tournament held at the Royal South Yarra Tennis Club in Melbourne, Victoria, Australia that was part of the 1974 Grand Prix tennis circuit. It was the inaugural edition of the tournament and was held from 21 October until 27 October 1974. Second-seeded Dick Stockton won the singles title.

Finals

Singles

 Dick Stockton defeated  Geoff Masters 6–2, 6–3, 6–2
 It was Stockton's 3rd title of the year and the 6th of his career.

Doubles

 Grover Raz Reid /  Allan Stone defeated  Mike Estep /  Paul Kronk 7–6, 6–4
 It was Reid's 2nd title of the year and the 2nd of his career. It was Stone's 2nd title of the year and the 6th of his career.

References

External links
 ITF tournament edition details

 
South Pacific Championships
South Pacific Championships, 1974
South Pacific Championships 
South Pacific Championships
South Pacific Tennis Classic